The 12592 / 91 Yesvantpur–Gorakhpur Express is a Superfast Express train belonging to Indian Railways North Eastern Railway zone that runs between  and  in India.

It operates as train number 12592 from Yesvantpur Junction to Gorakhpur Junction and as train number 12591 in the reverse direction, serving the states of Karnataka, Andhra Pradesh, Telangana, Maharashtra, Madhya Pradesh & Uttar Pradesh.

Coaches
The 12592 / 91 Yesvantpur–Gorakhpur Express has one AC 2-tier, four AC 3-tier, 11 sleeper class, four general unreserved & two SLR (seating with luggage rake) coaches and two high capacity parcel van coaches. It carries a pantry car.

As is customary with most train services in India, coach composition may be amended at the discretion of Indian Railways depending on demand.

Service

Routing

Traction
As the route is fully electrified, a Lallaguda-based WAP-7  pulls the train to its destination Gorakhpur Junction.

See also
 Gorakhpur–Secunderabad Express

References

External links
12592 Yesvantpur–Gorakhpur Express at India Rail Info
12591 Gorakhpur–Yesvantpur Express at India Rail Info

Express trains in India
Transport in Bangalore
Rail transport in Karnataka
Rail transport in Andhra Pradesh
Rail transport in Telangana
Rail transport in Maharashtra
Rail transport in Madhya Pradesh
Passenger trains originating from Gorakhpur